The Quakers Yard and Merthyr Railway in South Wales was owned jointly by the Great Western Railway and the Rhymney Railway.

History

Route

At its southern end, the line connected to the Vale of Neath line of the Great Western Railway (GWR) at Joint Line Junction, just west of Quakers Yard High Level railway station. The line ran up the Vale of Merthyr, and at the northern end it connected to the Merthyr branch of the Vale of Neath line at Cyfarthfa Junction.

Ownership and operation
The line was jointly owned and operated by the GWR and the Rhymney Railway; it opened in 1886.

Closure
The services ended in 1951.

Notes

References

Pre-grouping British railway companies
Great Western Railway constituents
Railway lines in Wales
Railway lines opened in 1886
Standard gauge railways in Wales